Blepharomastix pulverulalis is a moth in the family Crambidae. It was described by Herbert Druce in 1895. It is found in Guatemala, Panama and Mexico.

The forewings and hindwings are very pale greyish brown. The forewings are crossed by three waved darker brown lines from the costal to the inner margin. The hindwings are crossed by two fine waved darker brown lines.

References

Moths described in 1895
Blepharomastix